Central Market Kuala Lumpur is a market in Kuala Lumpur, Malaysia.

Background
Central Market Kuala Lumpur is located at Jalan Tun Tan Cheng Lock (Foch Avenue) and the pedestrian-only section of Jalan Hang Kasturi (Rodger Street), a few minutes away from Petaling Street and next to Klang River. It was founded in 1888 and originally used as a wet market, while the current Art Deco style building was completed in 1937. It has been classified as a Heritage Site by the Malaysian Heritage Society, and it is now a landmark for Malaysian culture and heritage.

History
The original building was built in 1888 by the British in colonial British Malaya. It was used as a wet market for Kuala Lumpur citizens and tin miners. The Wet Market was very convenient to the early city dwellers because it was within the vicinity of the Klang bus stand, the hub of feeder bus service for Kuala Lumpur and the train station.

Further expansions were made in 1889, 1895, 1920 and 1921. By 1933, the expansions to the warehouse made the market now in its present size and cost around $167,000.

As Kuala Lumpur experienced its development rapidly in the 1970s, there were plans to demolish the site. The intervention of the Malaysian Heritage Society proved timely as they successfully petitioned against its deconstruction, and the site was declared as a 'Heritage Site'.

During construction of Dayabumi near Klang River banks in 1981, the market was saved from demolition. The adaptive reuse renovation commenced in October 1985 and was completed in April 1986 to be officially launched during PATA Conference 1986. Central Market was renovated into a vibrant and colourful new style and had been officially known as Pasar Budaya, although popularly called Pasar Seni.

The  Central Market Annexe, located at the back of the main building,  formerly housed a cineplex and was opened in 2006. The Annexe houses a variety of eclectic art galleries. It is one of the significant art spaces in Kuala Lumpur and is a hub of activity all year long, which features artworks by local artists.

Located alongside the main building is the newly transformed, pedestrianised and covered walkway, Kasturi Walk. Opened in 2011, Kasturi Walk boasts an alfresco ambience featuring an exciting variety of stalls selling tantalising local snacks and exquisite souvenirs. The street is noted for housing street musicians or "buskers".

Features
The Central Market Kuala Lumpur is arranged in a stall concept, representing the traditional market in Kuala Lumpur since the 1800s. Travellers can scroll through the many sections within the Central Market, from the Lorong Melayu, Straits Chinese, and Lorong India, located on the west wing. The second floor hosts a food court, offering an array of food. Notable are two-storey and single-storey buildings resembling the kampong-style houses representing the many ethnic groups living harmoniously in Kuala Lumpur.

Architecture
 Art Deco architecture

Transport
Central Market Kuala Lumpur is near the  Pasar Seni station which is served by the LRT Kelana Jaya Line and the MRT Kajang Line. The station is named after the market.

Double-decker KL Hop-on Hop-off [74] sightseeing tour buses stop at the opposite of Central Market Kuala Lumpur ( In front of Geo Hotel - Stop No. 9)

The free bus service Go KL [75]- Purple Line starts at Pasar Seni Bus Hub, which is next to Pasar Seni station. 5 mins walk to Central Market

References

External links

 Official Central Market website
 Central Market Website - Chinese Version
 Tourism Malaysia - Central Market
 Kuala Lumpur Attractions Travel Guide: Central Market−Pasar Seni

Buildings and structures in Kuala Lumpur
Market houses
Retail markets in Malaysia
Commercial buildings completed in 1937
1888 establishments in British Malaya
1937 establishments in British Malaya
Tourist attractions in Kuala Lumpur
Art Deco architecture in Malaysia
British colonial architecture in Malaysia
Economy of Kuala Lumpur